First-seeded Margaret Smith defeated Jan Lehane 6–0, 6–2 in the final to win the women's singles tennis title at the 1962 Australian Championships.

Seeds
The seeded players are listed below. Margaret Smith is the champion; others show the round in which they were eliminated.

  Margaret Smith (champion)
  Darlene Hard (quarterfinals)
  Yola Ramírez (semifinals)
  Lesley Turner (quarterfinals)
  Jan Lehane (finalist)
  Mary Reitano (semifinals)
  Robyn Ebbern (third round)
  Madonna Schacht (third round)
  Judy Tegart (quarterfinals)
  Mary Bevis Hawton (third round)
  Lorraine Coghlan (third round)
  Norma Marsh (quarterfinals)
  Jill Blackman (third round)
  Fay Toyne (third round)
  Beverley Rae (third round)
  Dorothy Whitely (second round)

Draw

Key
 Q = Qualifier
 WC = Wild card
 LL = Lucky loser
 r = Retired

Finals

Earlier rounds

Section 1

Section 2

Section 3

Section 4

External links
 1962 Australian Championships on ITFtennis.com, the source for this draw

1962 in women's tennis
1962
1962 in Australian tennis
1962 in Australian women's sport